Elvis Mashike Sukisa (born 6 June 1994) is a Congolese footballer who plays as a forward for Maltese club Ħamrun Spartans.

Career

FC ViOn Zlaté Moravce
He made his professional debut for ViOn Zlaté Moravce against Ružomberok on 19 July 2014.

References

External links
 
 Futbalnet profile
 Fortuna Liga profile
 Eurofotbal profile

1994 births
Living people
Republic of the Congo footballers
Republic of the Congo expatriate footballers
Association football forwards
TJ Baník Ružiná players
ŠKF Sereď players
FC ViOn Zlaté Moravce players
MFK Lokomotíva Zvolen players
FK Senica players
MŠK Žilina players
Loko Vltavín players
SK Dynamo České Budějovice players
FC Slovan Liberec players
FK Viktoria Žižkov players
FK Slavoj Vyšehrad players
Slovak Super Liga players
2. Liga (Slovakia) players
3. Liga (Slovakia) players
Czech First League players
Czech National Football League players
Democratic Republic of the Congo expatriate sportspeople in Slovakia
Democratic Republic of the Congo expatriate sportspeople in the Czech Republic
Expatriate footballers in Slovakia
Expatriate footballers in the Czech Republic
21st-century Democratic Republic of the Congo people